Harry Lott was an African American Republican politician in Louisiana during Reconstruction. He was elected to the Louisiana House of Representatives, representing Rapides Parish, 1868 and 1870.

Lott accused the registrar of Rapides Parish of refusing and omitting a large number of African Americans from the voter rolls.

Joseph B. Lott also represented Rapides Parish in the House. He and Harry Lott were among the "colored" legislators who appealed to U.S. president Ulysses S. Grant to intervene in a dispute with governor Henry C. Warmoth.

He later worked as a night inspector at the United States Custom House.

His sister was allegedly a "Voudou queen".

References

Year of birth missing
Year of death missing
Place of birth missing
Place of death missing
19th-century American politicians
People from Rapides Parish, Louisiana
African-American politicians during the Reconstruction Era
African-American state legislators in Louisiana
Republican Party members of the Louisiana House of Representatives